Albert Edward Hodges (29 January 1905 – 23 September 1986) was a Welsh cricketer.  Hodges was a right-handed batsman who bowled right-arm leg break googly.  He was born at Briton Ferry, Glamorgan.

Hodges debut in County Cricket came for Monmouthshire in the 1926 Minor Counties Championship against Cornwall.  From 1926 to 1934, he played 27 Minor Counties matches for Monmouthshire, with his final appearance for the county coming against Berkshire in 1934.

Hodges made his first-class debut in 1930, when he represented Wales against the Marylebone Cricket Club at Lord's.  Six years later Hodges made his first-class debut for Glamorgan against Gloucestershire, in what was his only first-class appearance for the county.

Hodges died at Maindee, Monmouthshire on 23 September 1986.

References

External links
Bert Hodges at Cricinfo
Bert Hodges at CricketArchive

1905 births
1986 deaths
Sportspeople from Newport, Wales
Welsh cricketers
Monmouthshire cricketers
Glamorgan cricketers